Xinja is an Australian fintech company and former bank. Xinja was granted a full banking license by the Australian Prudential Regulation Authority in 2019. Xinja Bank was the second Australian neobank to be made an authorised deposit-taking institution. The company exited banking in December 2020 and returned to business in fintech.

History

Xinja was founded in 2017 by CEO Eric Wilson. The business began in fintech, offering products like prepaid cards and a money management app. In 2018, Xinja raised money via crowdfunding to develop its neobanking facilities. On 9 September 2019, Xinja was granted a banking licence by the Australian Prudential Regulation Authority. On 15 January 2020, Xinja Bank launched transaction and savings accounts using the BSB 775-775. In March 2020, the Dubai-based World Investments agreed to make a A$433,000,000 investment in Xinja Bank. Complications caused by the COVID-19 pandemic ultimately obstructed the Emirati investment and undermined Xinja Bank. In December 2020, Xinja announced that it would return its banking licence and return all deposits, ceasing to operate as a bank in Australia, though continuing its fintech business.

References

2017 establishments in Australia
Banks established in 2017
Banks of Australia
Neobanks